The Book of the Himyarites (Ktābā da-ḥmirāye) is an anonymous Syriac account of the persecution and martyrdom of the Christian community of Najran in the Kingdom of Himyar around 523 AD and the ensuing Aksumite interventions. It was written sometime between the sixth and tenth centuries in a Syriac Orthodox milieu.

Manuscript
The only known manuscript of the Book of the Himyarites is incomplete and partially damaged. It was discovered in 1920 in the protective boards of a codex bound in 1469/1470. The tenth-century codex had been repurposed for the binding of another, and in the process its pages were cut down. While some pages of text are entirely intact, others are fragmentary. The original tenth-century copy of the Book probably contained at least ten quires of twenty pages each. About 59 pages of text are preserved.

The script of the text is similar to that of the Codex Climaci Rescriptus from Edessa. The table of contents of the Book is preserved almost in its entirety. It contained 49 chapters. Each chapter is headed by a red rubric, although the name of the Himyarite king Masruq is never in red and is often deliberately written upside down.

The scribe of the manuscript was named Stephanos, and he worked in the church of Saint Thomas in the city of Qaryathen. He noted that he finished his work on 10 April 932.

Authorship and date
The text is anonymous as it stands, since no part of the surviving manuscript names an author. It was composed in a Syriac Orthodox milieu. Simeon of Beth Arsham, who lived in the first quarter of the sixth century and was thus a contemporary, has been proposed as the author. This proposal has not gained general acceptance, although Simeon is accepted as the author of a letter on the massacre. The letter and the Book are independent of one another and their commonalities seem to stem from the same oral reports. Ignazio Guidi suggested that the Acta of the martyr Arethas were either written by a certain Sergius, bishop of Rūṣafa, or else dependent on him as a source. Axel Moberg argues that Sergius was probably the author of the Book. Sergius, whose name is also given as George, was served alongside Simeon of Beth Arsham as an envoy of Emperor Justinian I to King Al-Mundhir III of Ḥirtā. David G. K. Taylor has suggested that Stephanos, usually taken to be the scribe of the manuscript, was in fact the author and not the scribe.

The Book was written sometime between the sixth and tenth centuries. Specifically, it achieved its final form no earlier than 526 and no later than 932. It was most likely written closer to the earlier date and is, with the letter of Simeon of Beth Arsham, one of the two earliest sources for the martyrdoms.

Synopsis
The Book of the Himyarites is a work of historiography, not hagiography. Although he "derive[d] from the events he related the moral that could serve to edify his co-religionists", the anonymous author's "principal aim was to give a full historical record of what had happened." Compared to the other sources for the martyrs of Najran, the Book is chronologically broader, covering the rise of Christianity and Judaism in Himyar and the aftermath of the persecution. It is also the most detailed account.

The text of the first six chapters and part of the seventh is lost. From the titles of the first three chapters it seems that they dealt with the paganism of the Himyarites, the adoption of Judaism by the ruling class and the arrival of Christianity. These are followed by chapters on the beginning of the persecution and a first Aksumite (Abyssinian) expedition against Himyar.

Précis of chapter headings
Owing to damage, not all chapter headings are complete, but most can be reconstructed.

Of the Jews and of the badness of their faith 
Himyarites, who they are and whence they first received Judaism
How Christianity began to be sown in Himyar
How Bishop Thomas informed the Abyssinians that the Himyarites were persecuting the Christians
The first coming of the Abyssinians
The amazing sign which the Lord showed the Himyarites in the ranks of the Abyssinians
The first departure of the Abyssinians
The beginning of the persecution by Masruq, the burning of the church in Zafar and the massacre of the Abyssinians
The coming of Masruq to Najran
The siege of Najran
The martyrdom of the first to suffer in Najran, when he was coming on the road
How the pure brethren of the holy order went out to Masruq
The burning of the church of Najran
The martyrdom by fire of ZRWYba
The martyrdom by fire of Tahnah and Aumah, her handmaid
The martyrdom of Hadyah, daughter of Tahnah, who also suffered martyrdom by fire
The martyrdom of Elishba, the deaconess, and of Ammai, sister of the holy order
The martyrdom of the freeborn men of Najran
The martyrdom of Harith and Arbai
The martyrdom of the freeborn women of Najran and of their young children together with them
The martyrdom of Habsa and Hayya, and another Hayya
The martyrdom of Ruhm, daughter of Azma; Aumah, her daughter; and Ruhm, her granddaughter
Other martyrdom of many women from the town of Najran
The martyrdom of men the names of whom we have not been able to learn
The contents of the letter that Masruq wrote to Mundhir, king of Hirta, against the Christians
The martyrdom of the blessed MHSa, the handmaid of God
The departure of Masruq from Najran
A martyrdom of [unknown]
The martyrs who suffered in Hadramaut
Burning of the church in Hadramaut
The martyrs who suffered in Marib
The martyrs who suffered in Hajaren
The martyrdom of D'a, sister of the holy order, and Thummaliki, the laywoman, after the departure of Masruq
The martyrdom of Dhiba and Hayya in Najran
The martyrdom of Hint and Amma from Najran
Dabb and Amr, the Najranites who were kept in custody till the Abyssinians liberated them
[unknown]
The arrival of the Abyssinians
How Umayyah came to Abyssinia and informed Bishop Euprepios and King Kaleb of all that Masruq had done
The petition brought by Umayyah to Euprepios and Kaleb as from the church of Himyar
The arrival of Kaleb with his army to make war
The address that the commander-in-chief made to his army, when he arrived by sea
The exhortation that Kaleb addressed to his army after the victory
The confessors who were released from Najran, and the sign of the cross on their hands
The petition brought to Kaleb by the Christians who had denied but repented, and came to do penance
The rebuke that Kaleb made to those Christians
The king of Abyssinia appointed a king in Himyar
The second address that Kaleb made to those who turned after having denied
Conclusion of this book after the return of Kaleb from Himyar

Influence
Moberg, the original editor of the Book, argued that it was the source of the Acta of Arethas, concluding that "the Acta are little more than an extract from some chapters of the Book." The main difference in their perspectives is that the Acta are written from a Byzantine perspective, while the Book has nothing to say about Byzantine involvement in the events of 523.

The Book may also have been a source for a hymn by John Psaltes, composed around 600. The hymn's brief introduction names Dhū Nuwās, the persecutor of Najran, as Masrūq, a name found in the Book.

While the Book is not a source of Simeon's letter, it is useful for interpreting it in light of the latter's tendentiousness.

Notes

Bibliography

External links
The Book of the Himyarites at ALVIN, platform for digital collections and digitized cultural heritage

Texts in Syriac
Najran
Himyarite Kingdom